Mariam Mohamed Fakhr Eddine (8 September 1933 – 3 November 2014) was an Egyptian film and television actress, and was the second wife of prominent filmmaker Mahmoud Zulfikar (1914-1970). She was nicknamed the "Beauty of the Screen". Before pursuing a career in acting, she won the title of Most Beautiful Face in a pageant organised by the French-language magazine Image. She was discovered by director Mahmoud Zulfikar, her future husband. Mariam Fakhr Eddine's first film appearance was in the 1951 film A Night of Love and she went on to appear in the films such as Back Again (1957), Sleepless (1957), The Cursed Palace (1962), Soft Hands (1963) and Secret Visit (1981).

In the late 1950s and early 1960s, she initially found success in larger sentimental roles before transitioning into portraying matriarch late in her career. Salah Zulfikar was a favorite leading man of her to work with, and she partnered with him in thirteen films. In 2007, Mariam Fakhr Eddine was cast as Mrs. Aida in the French-Canadian romantic drama film Whatever Lola Wants. She attended the Alexandria International Film Festival in 2009. Until her death in 2014, Fakhr Eddine appeared in more than 200 films. Her younger brother, Youssef Fakhr Eddine, was also a leading actor.

Early life and career
She was born in Faiyum, Middle Egypt to an Egyptian father and a Hungarian mother. Her younger brother is actor Youssef Fakhr Eddine (1935–2002). She was educated at a German high school. Before pursuing a career in acting, she won the title "Most Beautiful Face" in a pageant organised by the French-language magazine Image. She was discovered by film director Mahmoud Zulfikar, whom she married in 1952. She gave birth to her daughter, Iman. Her first film appearance was in the 1951 film A Night of Love. The film was entered into the 5th Cannes Film Festival. She went on to appear in the films The Murderous Suspicion (1953), The Good Land (1954), The Love Message (1954), A Window on Paradise (1954), Back Again (1957), Rendezvous with the past (1961), The Cursed Palace (1962) and Soft Hands (1963), and Secret Visit (1981).

Death
A few months after brain surgery, Fakhr Eddine died on 3 November 2014, at the Maadi Armed Forces Hospital in Cairo. Following a religious funeral held at the Maadi Military Hospital Mosque, she was buried in 6th of October City, Giza Governorate.

Filmography

Film

Television

References

External links

1933 births
2014 deaths
Egyptian film actresses
Egyptian Muslims
Egyptian people of Hungarian descent
Egyptian television actresses
People from Faiyum